Jhapa FC is a Nepali professional franchise  football club based in Jhapa district. The club currently competes in the Nepal Super League, the top flight of football in Nepal.

History
They were announced as one of the new franchises in the second edition in 2022

References

Association football clubs established in 2022
2022 establishments in Nepal
Nepal Super League
Football clubs in Nepal